Lars Larsen (born 19 July 1978) is a Danish former professional footballer who played as a left winger.

Career
Larsen started his career with Frederikshavn fI, but would most notably play for Randers Freja and the successor club, Randers FC, recording 73 games and 17 goals for the club. In between his stints with Randers, Larsen had a tenure with Herfølge Boldklub where he moved in January 2003 for kr. 500,000.

Larsen retired from football in 2008 after persistent injuries, and since worked as a salesman for Sports Direct while playing lower level football for Kristrup Boldklub.

References

External links
Lars Larsen – Danish Superliga stats at Dansk Fodbold (archived)

1978 births
Living people
People from Frederikshavn Municipality
Danish men's footballers
Danish Superliga players
Danish 1st Division players
Randers FC players
Herfølge Boldklub players
Odense Boldklub players
Skive IK players
Association football wingers
Sportspeople from the North Jutland Region